Myers as a surname has several possible origins, e.g. Old French  ("physician"), Old English  ("mayor"), and Old Norse  ("marsh").

People
Abram F. Myers (1889–after 1960), chair of the Federal Trade Commission and later general counsel and board chairman of the Allied States Association of Motion Picture Exhibitors
Alan Myers (drummer) (1954–2013), American drummer (Devo)
Alan Myers (translator) (1933–2010), English translator
Allan Myers (born 1947), Australian lawyer, businessman and philanthropist
Amina Claudine Myers (born 1942), American pianist, organist, vocalist, and composer
Amy Myers (born 1938), British mystery writer
Amy Myers (artist) (born 1965), American artist 
Andrew Myers (cyclist) (born 1968), Jamaican cyclist.
Andy Myers (born 1989), English professional footballer
Sir Arthur Myers (1868–1926), New Zealand politician 
Arthur Wallis Myers, CBE (1878–1939), British journalist and sportsman 
Barry Myers (director), English advertising filmmaker.
Baruch Myers (born 1964), American rabbi
Ben Myers (born 1976), British writer
Billie Myers (born 1971), British rock singer and songwriter
Bob Myers (born 1975), American basketball executive
Brad Myers, American football player
Brad Myers, American jazz guitarist and producer
Brad A. Myers (born 1957), American computer scientist
Bret Myers (born 1980), American soccer player and professor
Brian Reynolds Myers (born 1963), American academic, critic
Brett Myers (born 1980), American baseball player
Bruce Myers (1942–2020), British actor
Bryant Myers (born 1998), Puerto Rican reggaeton singer
Calev Myers, American–Israeli lawyer
Carlton Myers (born 1971), British-born Italian basketball player
Charles Andrew Myers (1913–2000), American labor economist
Charles G. Myers, New York State Attorney General (1860–61)
Charles Samuel Myers (1873–1946), English psychologist
Daisy Myers (1925–2011), African American educator
Daniel J. Myers (born 1966), American sociologist, professor, and textbook author
Dave Myers (presenter) (born 1957), English celebrity chef, television presenter
Dee Dee Myers (born 1961), American pundit; former White House Press Secretary
Dwight Myers (1967–2011), birth name of Heavy D, Jamaican-American actor, record producer, rapper, leader of Heavy D & the Boyz
Ernest Myers (1844–1921), English poet, classicist, and author
Eugene Myers (born 1953), U.S. professor at University of California, Berkeley
Frank J. Myers, country music songwriter (see also Baker & Myers)
Frederic Myers (1811–1851), Church of England clergyman and author
Frederic W. H. Myers (1843–1901), English poet, classicist, philologist, and a founder of the Society for Psychical Research
Garry Cleveland Myers (1884–1971), American psychologist
George W. Myers (1864–1931), American Math Professor, University of Illinois
George S. Myers (1905–1985), American ichthyologist
Gustavus Myers (1872–1942), American reporter, feature writer
Harry C. Myers (1882–1938), American film actor and director
Harry Myers (rugby) (1875–1906), English rugby player
Henry "Hy" Myers (1889–1965), American baseball player
Henry L. Myers (1862–1943), American politician; United States Senator (D-MT) 
Henry Myers (shortstop) (1858–1895), American baseball player
Isabel Briggs Myers (1897–1980), American author who co-created the Myers-Briggs Type Indicator
James Myers (disambiguation), several people
Jerome Myers (1867–1940), American painter
John Gillespy Myers (1831–1901), owner of John G. Myers Company, a department store in Albany, New York
John Golding Myers (1897–1942), British writer and entomologist
John J. Myers, Roman Catholic Archbishop, Archdiocese of Newark
John Myers Myers (1906–1988), American author
J. W. Myers (c. 1864–c. 1919?), Welsh-American baritone
Judith A. Myers (born 1939), American politician
Kathleen Myers (1899–1959), American actress
Kevin Myers (born 1947), Irish journalist
Kris Myers, drummer for the band Umphrey's McGee
Kyle Myers, American YouTube actor/presenter
Leo Myers (1881–1944), British novelist
Leonard Myers (politician) (1827–1905), American politician; U.S. Representative (R-PA) 
LeRoy Myers (1919–2004), American tap dancer
LeRoy E. Myers Jr. (born 1951), American politician (R-MD)
Lon Myers (1858–99), American world-record-setting runner
Lou Myers (1915–2005), American cartoonist and short story writer
Lynn Myers (born 1951), Canadian politician
Malcolm Myers (1917 – 2002) American painter, printmaker and professor known primarily for his Intaglio-style engravings.
Matt Myers (wrestler), American college baseball coach
Matthew Myers (cricketer) (1847–1919), English cricketer
Matthew Myers (judge) (born 1970), Australian judge
Matthew Myers (ice hockey) (born 1984), British ice hockey player
Meg Myers (born 1986), American musician
Sir Michael Myers (1873–1950), Chief Justice of the Supreme Court of New Zealand
Michael Myers (Pennsylvania politician) (born 1943), American politician (D-PA)
Mike Myers (actor) (born 1963), Canadian actor, comedian and screenwriter
Mike Myers (baseball player) (born 1969), American baseball player
Mordecai Myers (New York politician), American merchant, politician, and military officer
Paul Myers (musician) (born 1962), Canadian musician
Paul Myers (record producer) (born 1967), English record producer
Paul Myers, founding host of Christian radio program The Haven of Rest from 1934 to 1971
Paul Walter Myers (1932–2015), English record producer and writer
Philip Myers (musician) (born 1949), American musician
Philip van Ness Myers (1846–1937), American historian
Philippe Myers (born 1997), Canadian ice hockey player
PZ Myers (born 1957), American academic, biologist and science blogger
Quincy Alden Myers (1853–1921), Justice of the Indiana Supreme Court 
Randy Myers (born 1962), American baseball player
Richard Myers (born 1942), American military officer; United States Air Force general
Rob Myers (born 1986), American football player
Ronald Myers (1956–2018), American physician, minister, musician and activist
Russell Myers (born 1938), American cartoonist
Samuel L Myers Sr. (1919–2021), American economist and president of Bowie State University
Samuel L Myers Jr. (born 1949), American economist
Shirley Myers, Canadian country music artist
Stanley Myers (1933–1993), British film composer
Stewart Myers, American academic, educator 
Tobias Myers (born 1998), American baseball player
Tyler Myers (born 1990), American-born Canadian ice hockey player
Theodore W. Myers (1844–1918), American banker and New York City Comptroller
Thomas Myers (1774–1834), English mathematician and geographer
Vernā Myers (born 1960) American diversity consultant , author, speaker, lawyer, and corporate executive.
Walter Dean Myers (1937-2014) African-American author
Walter Myers Jr. (1914-1967) American judge
Wil Myers (born 1990), American baseball player
William James (Jim) Myers, better known as George "The Animal" Steele, American professional wrestler
William Myers (lawyer) (born 1955), American lawyer
William Myers (British politician) (1854–1933), British politician
Woody Myers (born 1954), American physician and politician
Vali Myers (1930–2003), Australian artist

Fictional characters
Get Blake Myers
Eric Myers, the Quantum Ranger
Michael Myers (Halloween)
Nina Myers (24)
Ros Myers (Spooks)

See also
Maier 
Mair (surname)
Mayer (name)
Mayr
Meier
Meir (name)
Meyer (disambiguation)
Meyers
Meyerson
Meyr (surname)
Myer (disambiguation)
Myers's Rum
Von Meyer

Notes and references

English-language surnames
German-language surnames

fr:Myers